Lenka Zavadilová (born 7 July 1975) is a Czech rower. She competed in the women's eight event at the 1992 Summer Olympics. Her brother Radek Zavadil is also an Olympic rower.

References

1975 births
Living people
Czech female rowers
Olympic rowers of Czechoslovakia
Rowers at the 1992 Summer Olympics
Rowers from Prague